The United States has many observances.

Days 
 January 13 - Stephen Foster Memorial Day
 February 1 - National Freedom Day 
 April 13 - Thomas Jefferson's birthday 
 May 1 - Law Day 
 May 1 - Loyalty Day 
 1st Thu. in May - National Day of Prayer 
 2nd Sun. in May - Mother's day (USA) 
 3rd Sat. in May - Armed Forces Day 
 3rd Fri. in May - National Defense Transportation Day 
 May 15 - Peace Officers Memorial Day 
 May 22 - National Maritime Day 
 last Mon. in May - Memorial Day 
 June 14 - Flag Day 
 June 14-July 4 - Honor America Days 
 3rd Sun. in June - Father's Day 
 July 27 - National Korean War Veterans Armistice Day (expired 2003) 
 4th Sun. in July - Parent's Day 
 August 19 - National Aviation Day 
 1st Sat. aft. 1st Mon. in September (Labor Day) - Carl Garner Federal Lands Cleanup Day 
 1st Sun. aft. 1st Mon. in September (Labor Day) - National Grandparents Day 
 September 11 - Patriot Day 
 September 17 - Citizenship Day 
 last Sun. in September - Gold Star Mother's Day 
 1st Mon. in October - Child Health Day 
 October 9 - Leif Erikson Day 
 2nd Mon. in October - Columbus Day 
 October 15 - White Cane Safety Day 
 December 7 - National Pearl Harbor Remembrance Day 
 December 17 - Pan American Aviation Day 
 December 17 - Wright Brothers Day

Weeks 
 1st in March - Save Your Vision Week 
 3rd in March - National Poison Prevention Week 
 week of May 15 - Police Week 
 week ending Fri. before Memorial Day - National Safe Boating Week 
 week of 3rd Fri. in May - National Transportation Week 
 week of June 14 - National Flag Week 
 June 14 (Flag Day) to July 4 (Independence Day) - Honor America Days 
 September 17 to September 23 - Constitution Week 
 2nd Sun. in October - National School Lunch Week 
 3rd Sun. in October - National Forest Products Week

Months 
 February - American Heart Month 
 April - Cancer Control Month 
 May - Asian/Pacific Islander American Heritage Month 
 May - Steelmark Month 
 September 15 to October 15 - National Hispanic Heritage Month 
 October - National Disability Employment Awareness Month (US)

See also
Title 36 of the United States Code
 International observance
 List of observances in the United States by presidential proclamation

External links 
 List of presidential proclamations (more...)
 More health observances
 Safety observances
 Injury observances

References

Public holidays in the United States
Unofficial observances
Observances
Observances